Poincaré model can refer to:

Poincaré disk model, a model of n-dimensional hyperbolic geometry
Poincaré half-plane model, a model of two-dimensional hyperbolic geometry

ru:Модель Пуанкаре